Taj Annan (born 16 August 2003) is an Australian rugby union player, currently playing for the . His preferred position is fly-half, centre or fullback.

Early career
Originally from Merewether, New South Wales, Annan moved to and studied at Brisbane Boys' College.

Professional career
Having left school, Annan joined Easts.

He was named in the Australia U20 squad in 2023, while he will also move to join Souths.

References

External links
itsrugby.co.uk Profile

2003 births
Living people
Australian rugby union players
Rugby union fly-halves
Rugby union centres
Rugby union fullbacks
Queensland Reds players